An ARS, which stands for Air - Roll - Spin, is a bodyboarding trick that combines an El Rollo with a 360° spin while the bodyboarder is in the air. The bodyboarder starts off by approaching the lip and doing the El Rollo, and during the rotation throws him/herself into a forward 360° spin. Michael Eppelstun invented the trick. The move was revolutionary and ushered in whole new gymnastic approach to riding a bodyboard. Kelly Slater credits the Rodeo Clown move was adapted from the ARS.

External links
ARS - Example video of an ARS

Bodyboarding